The 1996 Newfoundland general election was held on February 22, 1996 to elect members of the 43rd General Assembly of Newfoundland. It was won by the Liberal Party under new leader Brian Tobin. PC Leader Lynn Verge was not re-elected in her riding of Humber East.

Results

Party standings after the general election

Elected members by riding

See also
List of Newfoundland and Labrador General Assemblies
List of Newfoundland and Labrador political parties

Parties
Progressive Conservative Party of Newfoundland and Labrador (see also Progressive Conservative Party of Canada)
Liberal Party of Newfoundland and Labrador (see also Liberal Party of Canada)
Newfoundland and Labrador New Democratic Party (see also New Democratic Party)

References
Government of Newfoundland and Labrador
Elections Newfoundland and Labrador
Election Report

Further reading
 

Elections in Newfoundland and Labrador
1996 elections in Canada
1996 in Newfoundland and Labrador
February 1996 events in Canada